Sir Richard Preston, 1st Earl of Desmond (died 1628) was a favourite of King James VI and I of Scotland and England. In 1609 the king made him Lord Dingwall. In 1614 he married him to Elizabeth Butler, the only child of Black Tom, the 10th Earl of Ormond. In 1619 he created him Earl of Desmond.

Background and early life 
Richard was born the third son of Richard Preston of Whitehill in Midlothian, near Edinburgh. His family was gentry of the Edinburgh area and owned Craigmillar Castle in the late 16th and early 17th century.

Favourite 
His family placed Richard (the younger) as a page at the King's court in Edinburgh where he is mentioned in that capacity in 1591. King James had a series of personal relationships with male courtiers, called his favourites, suspected to have been the king's homosexual partners. Esmé Stewart, whom he made Earl and Duke of Lennox, seems to have been the first. After the Raid of Ruthven in 1582, the King was forced to exile Lord Lennox to France.

Richard, the page, gained the king's special favour in the 1580s or 1590s after Lennox's departure. When James acceded the English throne as James I in 1603, Richard accompanied him to England and was knighted at the King's coronation in London on 25 July 1603 in the old elaborate ceremony that included the bathing of the new knight. He then was made a groom of the privy chamber. In 1607 Richard was appointed constable of Dingwall Castle in Scotland. He bought the barony of Dingwall and on 8 June 1609 the King created him Lord Dingwall. In London the King met in 1608 Robert Carr who became his favourite and seems to have supplanted Lord Dingwall, as he was now, in that role.

In 1609 Preston attended the Accession day tournament, and presented a pageant of an artificial elephant, designed by Inigo Jones, which made its way slowly around the tiltyard.

Marriage and child 
In 1614 the King arranged for Lord Dingwall a marriage with the rich heiress Lady Elizabeth Butler, only daughter of the Black Tom, the 10th Earl of Ormonde and widow of Theobald Butler, 1st Viscount Butler of Tulleophelim, who died childless in January 1613.

The King imposed this marriage on Black Tom, Elizabeth's father, who did not want the royal favourite for a son-in-law but could not oppose the King's will. Black Tom died soon after the marriage on 22 November 1614.

 
Richard and Elizabeth had an only child:
Elizabeth (1615–1684), married James Butler and became Duchess of Ormond.

Later life and death 
On 19 July 1619 Lord Dingwall was created the 1st Earl of Desmond in the third creation of that title. In its first creation, the Earldom of Desmond had been held by the Hiberno-Norman FitzGerald dynasty. After the failure of the Second Desmond Rebellion against Queen Elizabeth I of England, the Geraldine earldom was forfeited to the Crown in 1582 and all its heirs attainted. The title was created for the second time for James Fitzgerald – a pathetic creature of the Crown who died penniless and without issue. After Richard Preston's death, the third creation became extinct in its turn. A fourth creation of the title passed to the family of the Earls of Denbigh.

Alfred Webb tells us of this creation of the earldom of Desmond that:

Thomas Butler, 10th Earl of Ormond, in right of his mother, Joan FitzGerald, daughter of the 11th Earl of Desmond, claimed the Earldom after the death and attainder of all the heirs male. When his daughter was married to James I.'s Scotch favourite, Sir Richard Preston, the title was conferred on him. When the only child of the latter, a daughter, was about to be married to the son of the Earl of Denbigh, the title was passed to the intended bridegroom. The marriage never took place; yet the title was retained [by] the Earls of Denbigh.

On 26 May 1623, King James I made the young James Butler, the future Duke of Ormond, a ward of Lord Desmond, and placed James at Lambeth, London, under the care of George Abbot, archbishop of Canterbury to be brought up as a Protestant.

His wife, Elizabeth Butler died on 10 October 1628 in Wales. On 28 October 1628 Lord Desmond was drowned on a passage between Dublin and Holyhead.

Notes and references

Notes

Citations

Sources 

 
 
  – 1613 to 1641
  – D to F (for Desmond)
  – N to R (for Ormond)
 
 
  – (for timeline)
  – Viscounts (for Butler, Viscount Mountgarrett)
  – Crawford to Falkland (for Dingwall)
  – Innermeath to Mar (for Lennox)
  – (for Richard Preston)

1628 deaths
17th-century Scottish peers
Earls of Desmond
Peers of Ireland created by James I
Peers of Scotland created by James VI
Year of birth unknown